This is a list of Chinese theatres.

 Anhui Huangmei Opera Theatre
 Beijing Concert Hall
 Beijing Peking Opera Theatre
 Beijing People's Art Theatre
 Century Theater & Century Performance Company
 Changchun Drama Theatre
 Chengdu Chuanju Theatre
 China Grand Theatre
 China National Children's Arts Theatre
 China National Opera House
 China Pingju Theatre
 Dongguan Yulan Theatre
 Guangdong Art Center Friendship Theatre
 Guangdong Chaoju Theatre 
 Guangdong Drama Theatre
 Guangdong Xinghai Concert Hall
 Guoan Theatre
 Hangzhou Grand Theatre
 Hangzhou Theatre
 Harbin Drama Theatre
 Harbin Grand Theatre
 Hebei Provincial Song and Dance Theatre of China
 Liaoning People's Art Theatre
 National Grand Theatre
 National Theatre Company of China
 Ningbo Grand Theatre
 Poly Theatre
 Shanghai Concert Hall
 Shanghai Grand Theatre
 Shanghai Opera
 Shanghai Peking Opera Theatre
 Shanghai Yueju Theatre
 Shantou Philharmonic Orchestra
 Shenzhen Cultural Center
 Shenzhen Grand Theatre
 Xi'an Qinqiang Theatre
 Zhejiang Song and Dance Theatre
 Zhejiang Victorious Theatre
 Zhongshan Concert Hall

See also
 Chinese theatre
 :Category:Chinese dramatists and playwrights

References

External links
Major theaters in China

Theatres in China
Performing arts venues in China
Chinese literature
Theatres
China
Theatres